Dewey "Deep" Rivers (December 15, 1898 – 	August 1970) was an American baseball left fielder in the Negro leagues. He played with the Hilldale Club in 1926 and the Baltimore Black Sox in 1933.

References

External links
 and Seamheads

Baltimore Black Sox players
Hilldale Club players
1898 births
1970 deaths
Baseball players from South Carolina
Baseball outfielders
People from Clinton, South Carolina
20th-century African-American sportspeople